Ololygon berthae is a species of frog in the family Hylidae. It is found in northeastern Argentina], southern Paraguay, Uruguay, and southern Brazil. It is named in honor of Bertha Lutz, a Brazilian zoologist and feminist.

It occurs in grasslands and rainforest clearings. Reproduction takes place in temporary pools, also in altered habitats. This locally common species is threatened by habitat loss and pollution.

References

berthae
Amphibians described in 1962
Amphibians of Argentina
Amphibians of Brazil
Amphibians of Paraguay
Amphibians of Uruguay
Taxonomy articles created by Polbot